Google Translator Toolkit was an online computer-assisted translation tool (CAT)—a web application designed to permit translators to edit the translations that Google Translate automatically generates using its own and/or user-uploaded files of appropriate glossaries and translation memory. With the Google Translator Toolkit, translators can organize their work and use shared translations, glossaries and translation memories. It allowed translators to upload and translate Microsoft Word documents, OpenDocument, RTF, HTML, text, and Wikipedia articles.

Google Translator Toolkit was supported by Google Translate, a web-based translation service. Google Translator Toolkit could be configured to automatically pre-translate uploaded documents using Google Translate.

Google Inc released Google Translator Toolkit on June 8, 2009. This product was expected to be named Google Translation Center, as had been announced in August 2008. However, the Google Translation Toolkit turned out to be a less ambitious product: "document rather than project-based, intended not as a process management package but simply another personal translation memory tool".

Originally the Google Translator Toolkit was meant to attract collaboratively minded people, such as those who translate Wikipedia entries or material for non-governmental organizations. However, nowadays it is also increasingly widely used in commercial translation projects.

"The significance of the Google Translator Toolkit is its position as a fully online software-as-a-service (SaaS) that mainstreams some backend enterprise features and hitherto fringe innovations, presaging a radical change in how and by whom translation is performed".

Translator Toolkit was shut down on December 4, 2019.

Source and target languages 
Starting with only one source language—English—and forty-seven target languages in June 2009, Google Translator Toolkit supported 100,000 language pairs. Translator Toolkit could translate from 345 source languages into 345 target languages.

User interface 
Google Translator Toolkit's user interface was available in eighty-five languages:

Workflow 

The workflow of Google Translator Toolkit can be described as follows. First, users upload a file from their desktop or enter a URL of a web page or Wikipedia article that they want to translate. Google Translator Toolkit automatically 'pretranslates' the document. It divides the document into segments, usually sentences, headers, or bullets. Next, it searches all available translation databases for previous human translations of each segment. If any previous human translations of the segment exist, Google Translator Toolkit picks the highest-ranked search result and 'pretranslates' the segment with that translation. If no previous human translation of the segment exists, it uses machine translation to produce an 'automatic translation' for the segment, without intervention from human translators.

Users can then review and improving the automatic translation. They can click on the sentence and fix a translation, or they can use Googles translation tools to help them translate by clicking the "Show toolkit" button.

By using the toolkit, they can view translations previously entered by other users in the "Translation search results" tab or use the "Dictionary" tab to search for the right translations for hard-to-find words. In addition, translators can use features like custom, multi-lingual glossaries and view the machine translation for reference. They can also share their translations with their friends by clicking the "Share" button and inviting them to help edit or view their translations. When they are finished, they can download the translation to their desktop. For Wikipedia articles, they can easily publish back to the source pages.

API 
Google Translator Toolkit used to provide an API which was restricted to approved users only.

References

Translator Toolkit
Translation databases